Anthony Brewer  may refer to:

Antony Brewer (1655), English playwright
Tony Brewer (born 1957), American Major League Baseball player in the 1984 season
Cllr. Anthony Brewer (1945–2020), English Political Councillor for Sutton-In-Ashfield, Skegby